Church of the Holy First Martyr Stephen, better known as the Lazarica Church (Serbian: Црква Лазарица/Crkva Lazarica), is a Serbian Orthodox church in Kruševac, Serbia. It was built in 1375-1378 as an endowment of prince Lazar of Serbia. Lazarica, as an outstanding achievement of the Serbian medieval architecture, was declared a Monument of Culture of Exceptional Importance in 1979, and it is protected by the Republic of Serbia. Lazarica was built as a prototype of the Morava school of architecture, as a palace church associated with the Kruševac Fortress, the capital of Prince Lazar. Today, only Lazarica and parts of the keep remain from the vast fortress complex.

History 
Information about the founding of the church can be found in the "Žitije despota Stefana Lazarevića" by Constantine of Kostenets. Lazar of Serbia built the church at the same time as the fortifications for the capital Kruševac. In 1455, Kruševac fell under Ottoman Empire rule, and the church was abandoned and desecrated. Lazarica was used as a stable for horses, and the roof was torn down for use elsewhere. During the Russo-Austrian-Turkish War, from 1736 to 1739, Lazarica was partially reconstructed, and the interior was painted with frescos by Andra Andrejević. After that, Kruševac fell under Ottoman rule again. The first major reconstruction of Lazarica occurred after the establishment of the independent Principality of Serbia, with numerous modifications over the next hundred years.

Architecture 

The church is in the form of a trefoil, a variant of the cruciform plan, with three bays in length, a dome over the central area and narthex, originally with open side passages. It has a semicircular apse on the inside, which is five-sided on the outside, with attached colonettes. The church is oriented five degrees from a perfect west–east orientation.

Lazarica's masonry is basically Byzantine style: continuity of horizontal rows of dressed white sandstone with three rows of brick joints associated with thick plaster, without insisting on randomly placed bricks. A peculiar process was used to draw thick mortar joints out from the wall.

See also
Ravanica monastery
Tourism in Serbia
Cultural Monuments of Rasina District

External links

 
ЛАЗАРИЦА 
Lazarica at TO Kruševac

References 

14th-century Serbian Orthodox church buildings
Medieval Serbian architecture
1378 establishments in Europe
Serbian Orthodox church buildings in Serbia
Archaeological sites in Serbia
Tourist attractions in Serbia
Cultural Monuments of Exceptional Importance (Serbia)